The Algerian Institute of Standardization (AIOS-IANOR), was erected in a public industrial and commercial fields (EPIC) by Executive Decree No. 98-69 of February 21, 1998, as part of restructuring INAPI (Algerian Institute of Standardization and Industrial Property).

See also 
 ASCII
 Fortran
 ANSI C
 ANSI ASC X9
 ANSI ASC X12
 ANSI escape code
 ANSI-SPARC Architecture
 National Institute of Standards and Technology (NIST)
 Institute of Nuclear Materials Management (INMM)
 Institute of Environmental Sciences and Technology (IEST)
 Accredited Crane Operator Certification
 Open standards

External links 
 official Web site

Organizations established in 1998
Standards organisations in Algeria
ISO member bodies
1998 establishments in Algeria